Who's Greatest Hits is a 1983 greatest hits compilation album from the Who released in the US. It includes the rare track "Relay", presented here in its original full length. An earlier appearance on Hooligans has shortened it by almost 30 seconds. It also includes the original single version of "Won't Get Fooled Again". Who's Greatest Hits has sold over 2 million copies and was certified 2× platinum by the Recording Industry Association of America.

Track listing
All songs written by Pete Townshend except where noted.

Side one
"Substitute" – 3:50
"The Seeker" – 3:14
"Magic Bus" – 3:25
"My Generation" – 3:19
"Pinball Wizard" – 3:03
"Happy Jack" – 2:12
"Won't Get Fooled Again" (Single version) – 3:38

Side two
"My Wife" (John Entwistle) – 3:36
"Squeeze Box" – 2:43
"Relay" – 3:48
"5:15" (Single version) – 4:53
"Love Reign o'er Me" (Edited version) – 3:07
"Who Are You" (Single version) – 5:02

Certifications

References

1983 greatest hits albums
Albums produced by Glyn Johns
The Who compilation albums
MCA Records compilation albums